Doomsayer may refer to:
 A doomer or peaknik (believer in drastic consequences from the peak oil theory)
 A character class in Deadlands: Hell on Earth
 A person or doomsday cult claiming a doomsday prediction